Bergh is a former municipality in the Dutch province of Gelderland. The municipality included the villages of 's-Heerenberg, Zeddam, and Stokkum.

In 2005, it merged with Didam to form the new municipality of Montferland.

External links
 ,  Maps of the municipality in 1868

Municipalities of the Netherlands disestablished in 2005
Former municipalities of Gelderland
Montferland